Ida B: ...and Her Plans to Maximize Fun, Avoid Disaster, and (Possibly) Save the World   is a 2004 children's novel written by Katherine Hannigan. The audiobook version is narrated by Lili Taylor.

Plot introduction
"Reference from McGraw Hill Reading Wonders Grade 5"
Independent Ida B. is home schooled and loves her life, spending a lot of time communing with nature.  When her mother is diagnosed with cancer, she faces a lot of difficult challenges. Her days of home school ends, and she has to go to public school. Worse, her parents need to sell part of her beloved orchard for medical bills, which means most of the trees will be cut down.
Upset by all the depressing changes around her, she stubbornly decides to separate herself from her parents, mostly spending time with her pet dog Rufus and cat Lulu.
But what she doesn't know is that going to Ernest B.Lawson Elementary School with Ms.W will change her life forever. <mcgrawhillreadingwondersgrade6>

Awards
 2004 Josette Frank Award winner
 2004 Publishers Weekly Best Children's Book selection
 2004 Borders Original Voices, Young Adult category
 2005 Quill Award Nominee

References

External links
Excerpt from Ida B published in USA Today
Author Interview: Katherine Hannigan on Ida B.

2004 American novels
American children's novels
2004 children's books